Malayalam is one of the Dravidian languages and as such has an agglutinative grammar. The word order is generally subject–object–verb, although other orders are often employed for reasons such as emphasis. Nouns are inflected for case and number, whilst verbs are conjugated for tense, mood and causativity (and also in archaic language for person, gender, number and polarity). Malayalam adjectives, adverbs, postpositions and conjunctions do not undergo any inflection; they are invariant.

Nouns
The declensional paradigms for some common nouns and pronouns are given below. As Malayalam is an agglutinative language, it is difficult to delineate the cases strictly and determine how many there are, although seven or eight is the generally accepted number. Alveolar plosives and nasals (although the modern Malayalam script does not distinguish the latter from the dental nasal) are marked with a macron below, following the convention of the National Library at Kolkata romanization.

Pronouns
There are three persons – first, second and third. The first person has three forms – singular, inclusive plural (i.e. speaker, listener, and possibly others) and exclusive plural (i.e. speaker and others, but not the listener). The second person has three forms – singular informal, singular formal and plural. Of these, the singular formal and plural forms are similar. A fourth form ('respectful' or 'official') is sometimes used in certain official documents and announcements.

The third person has eight forms – proximal and distal forms of singular masculine, singular feminine, singular neutral and plural. The masculine and feminine genders are used for humans and anthropomorphised non-humans. Non-living objects, plants and most animals take the neutral gender. The plural form is used for multiple objects of any gender. The plural form can also be used for a single person, either to show respect, or because the gender is unknown or irrelevant.

Cases
Vocative forms are given in parentheses after the nominative, as the only pronominal vocatives that are used are the third person ones, which only occur in compounds.

The mnemonic 'നിപ്രസം ഉപ്രസം ആ'  created by combining the first sounds of the case names is used.

Number 
The suffix -കൾ (-kaḷ), which changes to -ങ്ങൾ (-ṅṅaḷ) when the nouns ends in -അം (-aṁ), is the most common suffix for denoting plural nouns. It is used by all inanimate nouns, concrete or abstract, and most animate, non-gendered nouns. Two other suffixes, -മാർ (-māṟ) and അർ (-aṟ), are used exclusively by a few animate nouns. All suffixes follow the sandhi (സന്ധി) rules where applicable, and are not used when preceded by numeral adjectives. The following are a few examples.

Other nouns
The following are examples of some of the most common declensional patterns.

Adjectives 
Malayalam is thought to have no semantic category for adjectives, and instead relies heavily on using participial relative clauses for modifying nouns. There are two classes of words that typically act as adjectives.

 Native roots + a: This includes words such as നല്ല (nalla, good), വലിയ (valiya, big), and ചെറിയ (ceṟiya, short). All such words can be directly used as adjectives, without further modification. The conventional view regarding this category of words is that they typically encode the possession of the property they signify in the participial marker (-a) attached to them, meaning a word such as നല്ല (nalla) would actually mean "having goodness". For instance: ഇതൊരു നല്ല പുസ്തകമാണ് (itoru nalla pustakamāṇŭ), translating to "this is a good book", could be thought to mean "this is a goodness-having book". Note that when used in typical relative clauses, the marker -a can be inflected for tense, but not when used here in an adjectival sense.
 Borrowed roots + am: This includes words such as സങ്കടം (saṅkaṭaṁ, sadness), സന്തോഷം (santōṣaṁ, happiness), and ഉയരം (uyaraṁ, height/tallness). The -am at the end signifies the word's quality as a noun, which means that to use it as an adjective it has to be modified. This is in the form of -ഉള്ള (uḷḷa), the suffix for the non-finite existential copula. For instance: അവൻ ഉയരമുള്ള കുട്ടിയാണ് (avaṉ uyaramuḷḷa kuṭṭiyāṇŭ, translating to "he is a tall child") could be thought to mean "he is a tallness-having child". Since the suffix is non-finite it does not vary with tense or person.

Verbs 
Inflection of Malayalam verbs occurs for tense, aspect, and mode (TAM), and not for number (plurality) or gender. The dictionary form of verbs typically have the ending -ഉക (-uka), although some verbs have the ending ഇക (-ika) too.

Tenses
Broadly, there are three tenses in Malayalam language: present, past and future. Verb forms in different tenses are created by either simply replacing the citation form ending (for present and future tense), or by suffixing the verb stem (obtained by removing the citation form ending and the preceding consonant) with a special marker depending on the class of the verb (for past tense).

Present tense 
The present tense is formed by replacing the citation form ending with -ഉന്നു (-unnu). For example, the present tense form of പറയുക (paṟayuka, 'to say') is പറയുന്നു (paṟayunnu).

Future tense 
The future tense is formed by replacing the citation form ending with -ഉം (-um). For example, the future tense form of നടക്കുക (naṭakkuka, 'to walk') is നടക്കും (naṭakkum).

Past tense 
For most verbs the marker -ഇ (-i) (or യി, (-yi) if the verb stem ends in a vowel) is added to the verb stem to create the past tense form, but other verb classes have different rules. A non-exhaustive list of the rules for different classes, as well as some exceptions, is given below.

 If the citation form of the verb ends in a short vowel followed by -ടുക (-ṭuka) – that is, if it ends in -അടുക (-aṭuka), -ഇടുക (-iṭuka), -ഉടുക (-uṭuka), -എടുക (-eṭuka), or -ഒടുക (-oṭuka) – then replace the -ടുക at the end with -ട്ടു (-ṭṭu). For example, the past form of ഇടുക (iṭuka, 'to put'), is ഇട്ടു (iṭṭu).
 If the citation form ends in -യ്യുക (-yyuka), then replace that ending with -യ്തു (-ytu). For example, the past form of ചെയ്യുക (ceyyuka, 'to do') is ചെയ്തു (ceytu). 
 If the citation form ends in -അക്കുക (-akkuka), then replace that ending with -അന്നു (-annu). For example, the past form of നടക്കുക (naṭakkuka, 'to walk') is നടന്നു (naṭannu). An exception to this rule is നക്കുക (nakkuka, to lick), whose past tense is നക്കി (nakki).
 The past tense of ഇരിക്കുക (irikkuka, 'to sit, reside') is ഇരുന്നു (irunnu). But apart from this exception if the citation form ends in -ഇക്കുക (-ikkuka), then replace that ending with -ഇച്ചു (-iccu). For example, the past form of അടിക്കുക (aṭikkuka, 'to beat') is അടിച്ചു (aṭiccu).
 If the citation form ends in -ഉക്കുക (-ukkuka) or -ര്‍ക്കുക (-ṟkkuka), then replace that ending with -ഉത്തു (-uttu) or -ര്‍ത്തു (-ṟttu) respectively. For example, the past form of തണുക്കുക (taṇukkuka, 'to get cold') is തണുത്തു (taṇuttu), and the past form of ഓര്‍ക്കുക (ōṟkkuka, 'to remember') is ഓര്‍ത്തു (ōṟttu). The past tense form of ഒക്കുക (okkuka, 'to manage/be able to') is ഒത്തു (ottu).
 The past tense of  നില്‍ക്കുക (nilkkuka, 'to stand/wait') is നിന്നു (ninnu). But apart from this exception if the citation form ends in -ല്‍ക്കുക (-lkkuka), then replace that ending with -റ്റു (-ṯṯu). For example, the past form of തോല്‍ക്കുക (tōlkkuka, 'to lose') is തോറ്റു (tōṯṯu).
 If the citation form ends in -ള്‍ക്കുക (-ḷkkuka), then replace that ending with -ട്ടു (-ṭṭu). For example, the past form of കേള്‍ക്കുക (kēḷkkuka, 'to hear') is കേട്ടു (kēṭṭu).
 If the citation form ends in -യുക (-yuka), then replace that ending with -ഞ്ഞു (-ññu). For example, the past form of പറയുക (paṟayuka, 'to say') is പറഞ്ഞു (paṟaññu).
 If the citation form ends in -രുക (-ruka), then replace that ending with -ര്‍ന്നു (-ṟnnu). For example, the past form of തീരുക (tīruka, 'to end') is തീര്‍ന്നു (tīṟnnu).
 If the citation form ends in  -ലുക (-luka) or -ല്ലുക (-lluka), then replace that ending (whichever of the two it is) with -ന്നു (-nnu). For example, the past form of അകലുക (akaluka, 'to move away') is അകന്നു (akannu). However, the past tense of ചൊല്ലുക (cholluka, 'to narrate') may be either ചൊന്നു (chonnu) or ചൊല്ലി (cholli).
 If the citation form ends in -രിക (-rika), then replace that ending with -ന്നു (-nnu). For example, the past form of വരിക (varika,  'to come') is വന്നു (vannu).
 The past form of കാണുക (kāṇuka, 'to see') is കണ്ടു (kaṇṭu).
 The past form of തിന്നുക (tiṉṉuka, 'to eat') is തിന്നു (tinnu).

Verb conjugations for the verb "പോകുക" (pōkuka, to go) based on the commonly recognized aspects in Malayalam are given below. The past tense marker in this case is -ഇ (-i).

Copula 
Malayalam employs two defective verbs as its copulas. The first, -ആക് (ākŭ), is the plain equative copula. The second, -ഉണ്ട് (uṇṭŭ), is the locative copula and also used to indicate possession (with the subject/possessor in the dative case). These verbs change forms in different tenses and are usually suffixed to the noun phrases that are specified by the copula. The table below lists some examples.

Negation 
Standard negation is expressed through the use of the negative particle/suffix -ഇല്ല (-illa, literally "no"), regardless of tense. The equative copula -ആക്, however, is negated by the negative suffix -അല്ല (-alla) in the present tense; in all other tenses -ഇല്ല is used. When these particles are suffixed to their corresponding noun phrases, sandhi (സന്ധി) rules must be obeyed.

Sandhi (സന്ധി) 
Malayalam is an agglutinative language, and words can be joined in many ways. These ways are called sandhi (literally 'junction'). There are basically two genres of Sandhi used in Malayalam – one group unique to Malayalam (based originally on Old Tamil phonological rules, and in essence common with Tamil), and the other one common with Sanskrit.  Thus, we have the "Malayāḷa Sandhi" and "Saṁskr̥ta Sandhi".

Sandhi unique to Malayalam 
There are basically four Sandhi types unique to Malayalam – the "lōpa sandhi", "dvitva sandhi", "āgama sandhi" and "ādēśa sandhi".

Lōpa sandhi or "Elision"(ലോപ സന്ധി) 
The Lopa sandhi occurs when the varna (vowel) at the end of a word is lost when it merges with another word.  In most cases, the varna is the "samvr̥tōkāram". (the "closed u sound").

Dvitva Sandhi or "Rule of doubling" 
In Malayalam, gemination is more in tense consonants and less in lax consonants. When two words combine in which the first is the qualifier and the qualified, the tense consonants initial to the second word geminates.

Āgama sandhi or "Rule of arrival" (ആഗമ സന്ധി)
When two vowels undergo Sandhi, a consonant ("y" or "v") is added to avoid the pronunciation difficulty.

Ādēśa Sandhi or "Rule of substitution" 
In this Sandhi, one letter is substituted by another during concatenation.

This sandhi also includes Sanskrit Sandhi forms like vi + samam = viṣamam.

Sandhi common with Sanskrit 
These Sandhi rules are basically inherited from Sanskrit, and are used in conjunction with Sanskrit vocabulary which forms approximately 80% of Modern Standard Malayalam (the entire Sanskrit vocabulary is also usable with appropriate changes). The rules like savarṇadīrgha sandhi, yaṇ sandhi, guṇa sandhi, vr̥ddhi sandhi and visarga sandhis are used without changes.

Samāsam (സമാസം) 
All the Sanskrit samāsa rules are adapted to Malayalam compounds.  In Malayalam, the tatpuruṣa compounds are classified according to the vibhakti they are based on, during compounding. The "alaṅkāraṁ" is also used to classify tatpuruṣa compounds. There are 4 types of samasam: 1) āvyayi bhavaṉ 2) tatpuruṣa 3) dvandaṉ 4) bahuvr̥hi.

Vr̥ttaṁ (വൃത്തം) 
The vr̥ttaṁ consists of metres of Malayalam prosody. Like Sandhi, there are specific vr̥ttaṁs unique to Malayalam apart from the metres common with Sanskrit. As in case of Sandhi, the Malayalam vrittams are also named in Sanskrit.

Alaṅkāram (അലങ്കാരം) 
Alaṅkāraṁ or "ornamentation" is also based on Sanskritic grammarian classification.  It consists of the different figures of speech used in Malayalam poetry.  Being successor to Sanskrit and Maṇipravāḷam, most of Sanskrit alankaras are used in Malayalam.  Thus, the common figures of speech in poems are rūpakaṁ, utprēkṣā, upamā etc.

Words adopted from Sanskrit 
When words are adopted from Sanskrit, their endings are usually changed to conform to Malayalam norms:

Nouns 
 Masculine Sanskrit nouns with a Word stem ending in a short "a" take the ending "an" in the nominative singular. For example, Kr̥ṣṇa -> Kr̥ṣṇaṉ. The final "n" is dropped before masculine surnames, honorifics, or titles ending in "an" and beginning with a consonant other than "n" – e.g. Krishna Menon, Kr̥ṣṇa Kaṇiyāṉ etc., but Kr̥ṣṇan Eḻuttaccaṉ. Surnames ending with "aṟ" or "aḷ" (where these are plural forms of "aṉ" denoting respect) are treated similarly – Kr̥ṣṇa Potuval, Kr̥ṣṇa Cakyaṟ, but Kr̥ṣṇaṉ Nāyaṟ, Kr̥ṣṇaṉ Nambyāṟ, as are Sanskrit surnames such "Vaṟma(ṉ)", "Śaṟma(ṉ)", or "Gupta(ṉ)" (rare) – e.g. Kr̥ṣṇa Vaṟma, Kr̥ṣṇa Śaṟmaṉ. If a name is a compound, only the last element undergoes this transformation – e.g. Kr̥ṣṇa + dēva = Kr̥ṣṇadēvaṉ, not Kr̥ṣṇandēvaṉ.
 Feminine words ending in a long "ā" or "ī" are changed so that they now end in a short "a" or "i", for example Sītā -> Sīta and Lakṣmī -> Lakṣmi. However, the long vowel still appears in compound words, such as Sītādēvi orLakṣmīdēvi. The long ī is generally reserved for the vocative forms of these names, although in Sanskrit the vocative actually takes a short "i". There are also a small number of nominative "ī" endings that have not been shortened – a prominent example being the word "strī" "woman".
 Nouns that have a stem in -an and which end with a long "ā" in the masculine nominative singular have a "vŭ" added to them, for exampleBrahmā (stem Brahman) -> Brahmāvŭ. When the same nouns are declined in the neuter and take a short "a" ending in Sanskrit, Malayalam adds an additional "m", e.g. Brahma (neuter nominative singular of Brahman) becomes Brahmam. This is again omitted when forming compounds.
 Words whose roots end in -an but whose nominative singular ending is -a – for example, the Sanskrit root of "Karma" is actually "Karman" –are also changed. The original root is ignored and "Karma" (the form in Malayalam being "Karmam" because it ends in a short "a") is taken as the basic form of the noun when declining. However, this does not apply to all consonant stems, as "unchangeable" stems such as "manasa" ("mind") and "suhr̥ta (friend)" are identical to the Malayalam nominative singular forms (although the regularly derived "manam" sometimes occurs as an alternative to "manasa").
 Sanskrit words describing things or animals rather than people with a stem in short "a" end with an "m" Malayalam. For example, Rāmāyaṇa -> Rāmāyaṇam. However, "things and animals" and "people" are not always differentiated based on whether or not they are sentient beings – for example Narasimha becomes Narasiṃham and not Narasiṃhan, whereas Ananta becomes Anantan even though both are sentient.
 Nouns with short vowel stems other than "a", such as "Viṣṇu", "Prajāpati" etc. are declined with the Sanskrit stem acting as the Malayalam nominative singular (the Sanskrit nominative singular is formed by adding a visarga, e.g. Viṣṇuḥ) 
 The original Sanskrit vocative is often used in formal or poetic Malayalam, e.g. "Harē" (for Hari) or "Prabhō" (for "Prabhu" – "lord"). This is restricted to certain contexts – mainly when addressing deities or other exalted individuals, so a normal man named Hari would usually be addressed using a Malayalam vocative such as "Harī". The Sanskrit genitive is also occasionally found in Malayalam poetry, especially the personal pronouns "mama" (my/ mine) and "tava" (thy/ thine). Other cases are less common and generally restricted to the realm of Maṇipravāḷam.
 Along with these tatsama borrowings, there are also many tadbhava words in common use. These were borrowed into Malayalam before it became distinct from Tamil. As the language did not then accommodate Sanskrit phonology as it now does, words were changed to conform to the Old Tamil phonological system. For example: Kr̥ṣṇa -> Kaṇṇan.

References 
 3. Ravi Sankar S Nair 2012 A Grammar of Malayalam http://www.languageinindia.com/nov2012/ravisankarmalayalamgrammar.pdf

 
Malayalam language
Dravidian grammars